Cranberry Township is a township located in Avery County, North Carolina, United States.

Townships in Avery County, North Carolina
Townships in North Carolina